Joseph Berger-Barzilai (original name Itskhak Mordukhovich Zheliaznik, ; 29 November, 1904–31 March, 1978) was a founding member and the secretary of the Communist Party of Palestine and a Comintern official in Soviet who fell victim to Stalin's purges.

Berger-Barzilai was born in Cracow, Austria, in 1904. In 1914, his family fled the Russian army which threatened to invade their city for Vienna, and returned in 1916. He emigrated to Palestine at the age of 15 in 1920.

Originally a Zionist, he became a communist and took part in the founding of the Communist Party of Palestine in 1922 and became its secretary. In 1924, he was sent to Beirut to establish a branch of the party. The result was the Lebanese People's Party, a front organization, which was founded in October the same year around a communist party of Lebanon and Syria.

In 1924-25, Berger-Barzilai spent a few months in Moscow, where he met his wife Esther Feldman, a Russian Jew. Upon his return to Palestine, he was arrested for illegal activities in the Communist party and Comintern, but was only fined. After another trip to Moscow, the police authorities refused to let him in on August 16, 1926. As a stateless citizen, he had to remain aboard an Italian ship that sailed back and forth for six weeks. The International Aid Organization for Arrested Revolutionaries, together with Zionists, managed to obtain his release. After that, he lived in an Arab village, Beit Safafa, under false identity. He continued to lead the party and met with Comintern emissaries.

In the spring of 1928, he was again called to Moscow, where he had a five-hour meeting with Stalin on May 5, 1929. He received the order to sever the ties with the Arab Executive Committee and other parts of the Arab nationalist movement. He returned to Palestine in 1929 to take command of the party after the riots that year.

In 1932, he was summoned to Moscow, where he became a Soviet citizen and, after a short period as lecturer at the University of Moscow, a militant Comintern official who headed the Near Eastern section, and worked close to Stalin. Two years later, however, he was dismissed from his post and expelled from the party, and on January 27, 1935, he was arrested.

In a summary trial, he was sentenced to death, but was pardoned and sent to prisons and slave labor camps in Siberia. In 1951, he was released, only to be sentenced to another life term. His wife and son were also persecuted on his account, and they could see him only after 15 years, when they were allowed to visit him in Siberia. Berger remained a staunch communist, and relates that he and his family had lost a common language when they had abandoned Marxism. He spent twenty years in Siberia under severe hardships until he was released and rehabilitated in 1956. Thanks to his Polish origin, he was allowed to leave Russia, and eventually went to Israel.

Literature
Joseph Berger: Shipwreck of a generation: Memoirs (British title), Nothing But the Truth: Joseph Stalin's Prison Camps-A Survivor's Account of the Victim's he Knew (American title), (1971).

References 

1904 births
1978 deaths
Israeli communists
Leaders of political parties in Israel
Comintern people
Expelled members of the Communist Party of the Soviet Union
Israeli prisoners sentenced to death
Israeli prisoners sentenced to life imprisonment
Prisoners sentenced to death by the Soviet Union
Prisoners sentenced to life imprisonment by the Soviet Union
Stateless people
20th-century Israeli Jews
Jewish socialists
Jews from Galicia (Eastern Europe)
Polish emigrants to Mandatory Palestine
Burials at Kiryat Shaul Cemetery